Tobor the Great (a.k.a. Tobor) is a 1954 independently made American black-and-white science fiction film, produced by Richard Goldstone, directed by Lee Sholem, and starring Charles Drake, Karin Booth, and Billy Chapin. The film was written by Carl Dudley and Philip MacDonald and was distributed by Republic Pictures.

The film's storyline involves Dr. Ralph Harrison, who resigns his government post in protest against the inhumane treatment being inflicted upon spaceship pilots. His colleague, Professor Nordstrom, develops an alternative: a robot that he names "Tobor" (the reverse anagram of "robot"), which soon becomes a friend and playmate to Harrison's young son, "Gadge". Tobor is stolen by enemy agents, and only the two scientists' and Gadge's psychic link with the robot can save it from being reprogrammed and used for evil purposes against the United States.

Plot
At his underground laboratory in Los Angeles, Professor Nordstrom (Taylor Holmes), worried that manned space exploration is too dangerous, enlists the help of Dr. Ralph Harrison (Charles Drake), who recently left the new government-appointed Civil Interplanetary Flight Commission. The two scientists embark on a research project to create a robot that can replace humans for space flight. Nordstrom's daughter, Janice Roberts (Karin Booth), and her 11-year-old son Brian (Billy Chapin), nicknamed “Gadge”, become very interested in the project.

When a press conference is called to announce the creation of "Tobor", reporters, such as the inquisitive journalist Gilligan (Alan Reynolds), are invited to Professor's Harrison's home to see the remarkable invention. In order to undertake space travel, the remote-controlled robot has been given some human capabilities, including the ability to "feel" emotions and react via a telepathic device built into his robotic brain. Under the watchful eyes of Harrison's trusted assistant Karl (Franz Roehn), the giant robot Tobor is unveiled and then demonstrated. Unknown to the scientists, a foreign spy chief (Steven Geray) has quietly joined the group of reporters; he quickly draws up a plan to steal the robot.

While trying to perfect the robot's control systems, an inadvertent episode involving Gadge, who sneaks into the laboratory and turns on Tobor, shows that the robot can make emotional connections with people. Gadge not only controls the robot, but when he is accidentally tossed about, Tobor appears to comfort him, as if he is sorry for hurting the boy. After cleaning up, the scientists realize that an additional chair was brought to the news conference, leading them to believe that someone has infiltrated the closely guarded laboratory. Aware that their robot could fall into the wrong hands, they construct a small transmitter in a fountain pen that is able to communicate with Tobor.

An organized attack by the foreign agents is thwarted by the defensive devices at the Nordstrom's home, so the spies devise another scheme. Sending Gadge and his grandfather an invitation to a space flight presentation at the Griffith Park Planetarium, they intend to hold them hostage. When Gadge and Nordstrom show up, the spies kidnap them. Dr. Gustav (Peter Brocco) tries to force Nordstrom to provide the crucial information needed to control Tobor.

When Nordstrom and Gadge do not return for the military demonstration of Tobor's abilities, Dr. Harrison contacts the local sheriff with his concerns that something dire has happened to them. Tobor is suddenly activated, reacting to messages sent by Nordstrom, and storms out of the house, driving away in a military Jeep. Nordstrom is actually controlling the robot remotely with the pen transmitter, while trying to fool Dr. Gustav. One of the spies realizes that the pen is important and snatches it away, breaking it.

Guessing that Tobor is going to rescue the professor and Gadge, Harrison and the military follow. At the agents' lair, when the transmissions stop, Tobor comes to an abrupt halt, but Harrison successfully re-activates the robot using telepathic commands. The spies threaten to hurt Gadge, who instinctively reacts and uses his mind to call out to Tobor. Nordstrom relents, writing out the control formula. With Harrison and the military, the robot breaks down the lair's door and attacks the enemy agents, rescuing the professor and Gadge. When one of the spies attempts to drive away with the coerced information, Tobor yanks him out of his car. Gadge is then gently carried out by the robot.

Later, when Tobor has been successfully reprogrammed, a spacecraft is launched with the robot in full control of the mission.

Cast

 Charles Drake as Dr. Ralph Harrison
 Karin Booth as Janice Roberts
 Billy Chapin as Brian “Gadge” Roberts
 Taylor Holmes as Professor Arnold Nordstrom
 Alan Reynolds as Gilligan, Reporter
 Steven Geray as Foreign spy chief
 Henry Kulky as Paul, spy henchman
 Franz Roehn as Karl
 Hal Baylor as Max, spy henchman
 Peter Brocco as Dr. Gustav
 Norman Field as Commissioner 
 Robert Shayne as General
 Lyle Talbot as Admiral
 Emmett Vogan as Congressman
 William Schallert as Johnston
 Helen Winston as Secretary
 Lew Smith as Tobor
 Jack Daly as Scientist
 Maury Hill as Scientist

Production
Principal photography for Tobor the Great took place from early to mid-January 1954 on location at the Iverson Movie Ranch in Chatsworth, California.

Contrary to popular belief, the robot was not designed by Robert Kinoshita, creator of Robby the Robot. According to both production sketches and "movie robot" authority Fred Barton, Tobor was designed by Gabriel Scognamillo and built by Mel Arnold, who also worked on Gort for The Day the Earth Stood Still.
The original Tobor prop and remote control device is still in existence, having been stored away safely in a private collection for more than 50 years.

There is an on-line company, Fred Barton Productions, that sells screen-accurate, full-size replicas of Tobor as seen in the film.

Reception
In a review in The New York Times Tobor the Great is characterized as "This children's sci-fi adventure (that) chronicles the friendship between an 11-year-old and his grandfather's robot Tobor, who was designed to explore deep space." In DVD Savant film reviewer Glenn Erickson called it, "Like other low budget Republic shows of its day, the film is sturdy, slow and straightforward, taking little advantage of the ideas in its script. Yet it was a kiddie favorite simply because it was about a boy who shared an adventure with a massive metal man." In an appraisal of Tobor the Great film historian and reviewer Leonard Maltin noted "the film missed out on becoming an important sci-fi classic ... terrible acting and dialogue. A botched attempt at a heartwarming sci-fi comedy-thriller".

Legacy
The film inspired a Tobor the Great comic book story series, written by Denis Gifford and with artwork by James Bleach; it appeared in Star Comics #1-2 (1954), from D Publications.

Here Comes Tobor was a proposed American science-fiction TV series. Produced for the 1956–1957 season, the project was never picked up and only a pilot episode was filmed but never aired.

A new film company, Diamond World Pictures, announced in 2011 that a sequel to Tobor the Great was to be the first film from the company. Plans were to star Patrick Dempsey and Christopher Plummer, and use the classic combination of live-action and stop-motion animation. To date, no film has been released.

Home video
Tobor the Great was released on DVD on May 13, 2008 by Lionsgate Home Entertainment. The standard DVD, containing the film only, used an incorrect open matte transfer; it was originally shot for theatrical exhibition in the 1.66:1 widescreen aspect ratio.

In December 2016, the film was announced for both DVD and Blu-ray reissue by Kino Lorber.

References

Notes

Bibliography

 Ichbiah, Daniel. Robots: From Science Fiction to Technological Revolution. New York: Harry N. Abrams, 2005. .
 Maltin, Leonard. Leonard Maltin's Movie Guide 2009. New York: New American Library, 2009 (originally published as TV Movies, then Leonard Maltin’s Movie & Video Guide), First edition 1969, published annually since 1988. .
 Terrace, Vincent. Crime Fighting Heroes of Television: Over 10,000 Facts from 151 Shows, 1949-2001. Jefferson, North Carolina: McFarland & Company, 2002. .
 Warren, Bill. Keep Watching the Skies: American Science Fiction Films of the Fifties, 21st Century Edition (revised and expanded). Jefferson, North Carolina: McFarland & Company, 2009. .
 Weaver, Tom. Return of the B Science Fiction and Horror Heroes: The Mutant Melding of Two Volumes of Classic Interviews. Jefferson, North Carolina: McFarland & Company, 2000. .

External links

 
 
 
 

1954 films
1950s science fiction films
American robot films
American black-and-white films
American science fiction films
Republic Pictures films
1950s English-language films
1950s American films